Belalcázar is a town and municipality in the Colombian Department of Caldas.

References

Municipalities of Caldas Department